LNY, or Lny, may refer to

IATA code for Lanai Airport, Hawaii, US
National Rail code for Langley railway station, Berkshire, UK
Lunar New Year

See also